Arthur Munn (22 February 1888 – 15 September 1975) was an Australian cricketer. He played two first-class matches for New South Wales between 1912/13 and 1913/14.

See also
 List of New South Wales representative cricketers

References

External links
 

1888 births
1975 deaths
Australian cricketers
New South Wales cricketers
Cricketers from Sydney